The United Golfers Association (UGA) was a group of African-American professional golfers who operated a separate series of professional golf tournaments for Blacks during the era of racial segregation in the United States. It was said to have started in 1925 when George Adams became a founding member and in 1926 by Robert Hawkins, a golfer from Massachusetts. It was known affectionately as the Chitlin Circuit and included many talented golfers such as Ted Rhodes, Bill Spiller, Pete Brown, Lee Elder, Willie Brown Jr., Zeke Hartsfield, Howard Wheeler, and Charlie Sifford.

Women were allowed to participate from the group's inception, but only in 1939 did the first women's golfing organization seek affiliation when the Chicago Women's Golf Club, organized by Anna Robinson, applied to join. Also, the Wake-Robin Golf Club, whose first president was Helen Webb Harris, joined the UGA under her leadership.

Jimmy Taylor added the Mid Winter Classic at Rogers Park, Tampa to the circuit in 1963.

From 1934 through November 1961, the Professional Golfers Association of America maintained a "Caucasian-only" membership clause in its bylaws. The clause was removed by amending its constitution. 

Contemporary golf associations for African Americans include the African American Golf Association (AAGA), United States Black Golf Association, United Black Golfers Association (UBGA), Western States Golf Association, Bogey Boyz, Black Jewels Ladies Golf Association and the African American Golf Foundation, Inc.

References

Golf associations
Golf in the United States
Defunct sports governing bodies